La Totale! (The Total!) is a 1991 French spy comedy film directed by Claude Zidi. The film was the basis for director James Cameron's 1994 action comedy True Lies.

Plot
François Voisin is a telecommunications employee with an ostensibly unremarkable life. In reality François is a secret agent. He is reputed to be one of the best in his profession earning him the moniker l'Épée or, "The Sword". He hides his activities from his wife.

François is coming home on his 40th birthday, for which his wife has secretly prepared a surprise party with old friends with whom he used to fence. He is called back by his colleague Albert for a mission involving planting a microphone in an arms smuggler's car. He succeeds after a struggle. As he arrives home, his friends mock his "boring" life.

The planted microphone leads the Secret Service to a prostitute. After infiltrating her apartment and planting a camera, they discover she is helping a missile expert and the smuggler to meet. They then intercept and destroy a missile convoy. Meanwhile, François' wife Hélène is living a monotonous life.

Hélène then meets Simon, who pretends to be a secret agent while in reality he is a car dealer living in a caravan. François discovers Hélène is meeting someone in secrecy and believes she is cheating. He therefore uses the agency's resources to spy on her and find out more about Simon. When Simon lures Hélène to his caravan, François kidnaps both of them. He makes his wife believe that Simon was a terrorist and then makes Hélène believe she has to work for the agency to secure her freedom. She is unaware that François is behind this, and gets sent to a hotel room for a mission where he plans on surprising her. At this point, they both get kidnapped by henchmen of the arms dealer. After François admits his true identity to Hélène, he manages for them to escape. They thwart the arms dealer's plan of blowing up a football stadium in Paris and all ends well.

The film concludes with François' 41st birthday. He and Hélène kidnap a dangerous man who turns out to be Simon pretending to be someone else.

Cast

References

External links
 

1991 films
1991 comedy films
1990s adventure comedy films
1990s spy comedy films
Films directed by Claude Zidi
Films scored by Vladimir Cosma
Films shot in Paris
French adventure comedy films
1990s French-language films
French spy comedy films
1990s French films